The women's 20 kilometres walk at the 2018 Commonwealth Games, as part of the athletics programme, took place at Currumbin Beachfront on 8 April 2018.

Records
Prior to this competition, the existing world and Games records were as follows:

Schedule
The schedule was as follows:

All times are Australian Eastern Standard Time (UTC+10)

Results
The results were as follows:

Notes
> Bent knee
~ Loss of contact

References

Women's 20 kilometres walk
2018
2018 in women's athletics